Arnoldus is a given name. Notable persons with that name include:

 Arnoald ( 550 – c. 611), Frankish bishop
 Arnoldus van Anthonissen (1631–1703), Dutch painter
 Arnoldus Arlenius (1510s–1582), Dutch humanist philosopher and poet
 Arnoldus Blignaut (born 1978), Zimbabwean cricketer
 Arnoldus Bloemers (1792–1844), Dutch painter
 Arnoldus Clapmarius (1574–1604), German academic, jurist and humanist
 Arnoldus Johannes Eymer (1803–1863), Dutch painter, draftsman, lithographer and watercolourist
 Arnoldus Hille (1829–1919), Norwegian bishop
 Arnoldus Montanus (1625–1683), Dutch teacher and author
 Arnoldus Vanderhorst (1748–1815), American militia leader

See also 
 Arnaldus

References 

Dutch masculine given names